The Erg Iguidi, is a large erg in the area of Tindouf in southwestern Algeria extending into northern Mali and Mauritania.

Geography
The Erg Iguidi is a sandy desert with a clear pattern of narrow linear dunes stretching for a length of 400 km. Part of the greater Sahara, it is located in its northwestern region and is characterized by Harmattan withering winds. The highest point is 540 m. 

Compared to the neighboring Erg Chech to the south, this erg is relatively humid. Groundwater is especially abundant towards the north-eastern edge of the Erg Iguidi. There are patches of seasonal vegetation with grasses and shrubs and in the summer the desert is used as a pasturage area. The Erg Iguidi supports a population of slender-horned gazelle.

See also
Geography of Algeria
List of ergs

References

Ergs of Africa
Landforms of Algeria
Landforms of Mali
Landforms of Mauritania
Natural regions of Africa
Geography of Tindouf Province